Bracken House is a building at 1 Friday Street and 10 Cannon Street in the City of London, occupied by the Financial Times newspaper until the 1980s, and again beginning May 2019. A late example of modern classicism, it was constructed from 1955 to 1958 to a design by Sir Albert Richardson to serve as the headquarters and printing works of the Financial Times, on a cleared bomb site southeast of St Paul's Cathedral.  

The central part of the building was substantially altered to plans by Michael Hopkins and Partners between 1988 and 1992.  After refurbishments by John Robertson Architects, the Financial Times moved back into Bracken House in spring 2019.

It became a Grade II listed building in 1987 – the first building built after the Second World War in England to become listed – and was upgraded to Grade II* in 2013.

Background
New offices were required for the Financial Times after it merged with the Financial News in 1945.  The building was named after Brendan Bracken, who became Viscount Bracken in 1952.

The building was clad in pink sandstone from Hollington, Staffordshire, as an allusion to the characteristic pink colour of the newspaper, with red bricks and bronze windows, contrasting with the verdigris of the copper roof.  Editorial offices were located in the northern range, beside Cannon Street, with printing machinery in an octagonal structure in the centre between Friday Street and Distaff Lane, and more offices to the south, by Queen Victoria Street.  Above the entrance on Cannon Street is an astronomical clock, designed by Frank Dobson and Philip Bentham and made by Thwaites & Reed.  The clock features the face of Winston Churchill at the centre of a large gold sunburst, Churchill having been a great friend of Viscount Bracken during the war.

1980s redevelopment
Like other newspapers, the Financial Times moved out of central London in the 1980s, and the printing works closed in 1988.  The building was sold by Pearson in 1987.  

In August 1987 Bracken House became one of the first post-war buildings in England to become a Listed Building, (in the illustrious company of works such as Lord Foster's Willis Faber and Dumas Building, Ipswich, England of 1975), to prevent it being demolished and replaced by a new glass and steel building proposed by Michael Hopkins and Partners (the post-war Brynmawr Rubber Factory was listed in 1985 by the Welsh Office).  The plans were changed to incorporate the old building, redeveloped by Obayashi Corporation between 1988 and 1992.  The altered building retained the old ranges to the north and south, but replaced the central printing hall with a new glass and structural gunmetal structure on a Hollington sandstone plinth, with boxy oriel windows inspired by Oriel Chambers in Liverpool (constructed in 1864).  With its main entrance now at 1 Friday Street to the east, the building was altered to include large open offices and trading floors for the European head office of the Industrial Bank of Japan, which combined with Dai-Ichi Kangyo Bank and Fuji Bank in 2002 to form Mizuho Financial Group, the third largest bank in Japan. The Hopkins additions were included in the Grade II* listing in 2013.

In 2019 the Financial Times relocated from its offices at Southwark Bridge back to Bracken House.

References

 Bracken House, National Heritage List for England, Historic England
 London Remembers
 London Architecture Guide
 e-architect.co.uk
 Original building, City of London

Financial Times
Office buildings in London
Grade II* listed buildings in the City of London
Office buildings completed in 1958
Buildings by Hopkins Architects
Modern architecture in the United Kingdom
Neoclassical architecture in London
Astronomical clocks in the United Kingdom